Philips Fabrikk Norsk was a lightbulb manufacturing company in Oslo, later Arendal, Norway.

It was established in 1936 by Jo Polak, a Dutch immigrant who in 1923 had founded Norsk Philips, the Norwegian branch of Philips. The factory produced incandescent light bulbs for the corporation. The production facility was at Brenneriveien 9 near Akerselva until 1948, when it was moved to Arendal. It was later closed, around 1983.

References

Manufacturing companies established in 1936
1936 establishments in Norway
Companies disestablished in the 1980s
Manufacturing companies based in Oslo
Akerselva
Companies based in Agder
Arendal
Electronics companies of Norway
Defunct companies of Norway
1980s disestablishments in Norway